The red-headed bunting (Emberiza bruniceps) is a passerine bird in the bunting family Emberizidae, a group now separated by most modern authors from the finches, Fringillidae.

It breeds in central Asia-Afghanistan, Iran, Kazakhstan, Kyrgyzstan, Mongolia; Russian Federation (European Russia, Central Asian Russia), Tajikistan, Turkmenistan, Uzbekistan, China. It is migratory, wintering in India and Bangladesh. Its status in western Europe, where it is a potential vagrant, is confused by escapes, especially as this species is more commonly recorded than the closely related black-headed bunting, despite the latter having a more westerly breeding range. Reports in Britain have declined dramatically over recent years, coinciding with the decline in some Emberizidae species for the impact of Asiatic imports illegal trade.

The red-headed bunting breeds in open scrubby areas including agricultural land. It lays three to five eggs in a nest in a tree or bush. Its natural food consists of seeds, or when feeding young, insects.

This bird is 17 cm long, larger than reed bunting, and long-tailed. The breeding male has bright yellow underparts, green upperparts and a brownish-red face and breast.

The female is a washed-out version of the male, with paler underparts, a grey-brown back and a greyish head. The juvenile is similar, and both can be difficult to separate from the corresponding plumages of black-headed bunting.

The song, given from a high perch, is a jerky sweet-sweet-churri-churri-churri.

Gallery

References

 Buntings and Sparrows by Byers, Olsson and Curson, 

red-headed bunting
Birds of Central Asia
red-headed bunting